Braslau may refer to:

Braslaw (Braslaŭ), variant transliteration of the name of a city in Belarus
Braslaw District, Belarus
Braslaw Lakes, a national park in Belarus
Sophie Braslau (1892–1935), American contralto

See also
Breslau, former name of Wrocław, Poland